

Hanns-Horst von Necker (28 August 1903 – 27 February 1979) was a highly decorated Generalmajor in the Luftwaffe during World War II who commanded the Fallschirm-Panzer Division 1 Hermann Göring.  He was a recipient of the Knight's Cross of the Iron Cross of Nazi Germany. Necker was surrendered to the British forces in 1945 and was interned until 1947.

Awards and decorations

 Knight's Cross of the Iron Cross on 24 June 1944 as Oberst and commander of Fallschirm-Panzergrenadier-Regiment 2 "Hermann Göring".

References

Citations

Bibliography

 
 
 

1903 births
1979 deaths
People from Rudolstadt
Luftwaffe World War II generals
People from Schwarzburg-Rudolstadt
Recipients of the Gold German Cross
Recipients of the Knight's Cross of the Iron Cross
German prisoners of war in World War II held by the United Kingdom
Reichswehr personnel
Major generals of the Luftwaffe
Military personnel from Thuringia